The 2013 Pan American Judo Championships was held in San José, Costa Rica from April 19–20, 2013.

Medal table

Men's events

Women's events

References

External links
 
 Pan American Judo Federation
 Brazilian Judo Federation

American Championships
2013 in Costa Rican sport
2013 
Judo competitions in Costa Rica
International sports competitions hosted by Costa Rica